Paul Anthony Flowers (born 7 September 1974) is an English former footballer who played as a defender in the Football League for Colchester United.

Career

Born in Stepney, London, Flowers signed as an apprentice at Colchester United. He made his debut for the club on 12 March 1993 in a 4–2 home defeat to Cardiff City. He made a further two appearances for the U's, with his final game coming on the last day of the 1992–93 season, a 4–3 away defeat at Wrexham on 8 May 1993. He was released from Colchester that summer, joining Grays Athletic.

References

1974 births
Association football defenders
Colchester United F.C. players
English footballers
Grays Athletic F.C. players
Living people
Footballers from Stepney
English Football League players